1 Night in San Diego is a 2020 American comedy film written and directed by Penelope Lawson. The film was released on video on demand on November 17, 2020.

Plot
Hannah, a former reality star, and Brooklyn, a social media influencer, are a pair of best friends and wannabe celebrities who have recently moved out to Hollywood. Facing personal and professional woes, they accept an invitation to spend time with a former high school crush in San Diego. When they ultimately find him unappealing, they decide to spend a debauchery-filled night out in the city that will test the limits of their friendship.

Cast 
 Jenna Ushkowitz as Hannah
 Laura Ashley Samuels as Brooklyn
 Alexandra Daddario as Kelsey
 Eric Nelsen as Gordo
 Mark Lawson as Christian
 Adam Rose as Kevin
 Brian Borello as Teddy
 Kelsey Douglas as Delia
 Nicolas diPierro as Concierge

Release
The film was released on VOD and digital platforms on November 17, 2020.

References

External links
 
 

2020 films
2020 comedy films
American comedy films
2020s female buddy films
2020s English-language films
Films set in San Diego
1091 Pictures films
2020s American films